Suan can refer to:

 Suan, Atlántico, Colombia
 Sivan, East Azerbaijan, a village in Iran
 Suan County, a county of North Hwanghae Province, North Korea
 Suan Station, a station of the Busan Metro, South Korea
 a minor Kazakh Zhuz ("horde"), numbering ca. 30,000